is a Japanese rakugo performer and a featured member of the long-running television comedy show Shōten. The new Kikuzō Hayashiya is his son, the former Kikuō Hayashiya. On Shōten he always wears a yellow kimono. He is known for making commonplace jokes and usually "plays the fool".

Discography

Singles

Kikuzō Ramen 
Kikuō has a chain of noodle shops named after him called "Kikuzō Ramen." On Shōten, he often advertises Kikuzō Ramen, but other members joke about it being very flavorless.

References

Other Websites 
 Kikuō's HP
 

Japanese male comedians
Rakugoka
Japanese male musicians
Japanese bloggers
1937 births
Living people
Japanese YouTubers